Lewis Sidney Riggs (April 22, 1910 – August 12, 1975) born in Caswell County, North Carolina was a third baseman for the St. Louis Cardinals (1934), Cincinnati Reds (1935–40) and Brooklyn Dodgers (1941–42 and 1946).

He helped the Cardinals win the 1934 World Series, the Reds win the 1939 National League pennant and 1940 World Series and the Dodgers win the 1941 NL pennant. He was named to the 1936 National League All-Star team.

His eighth-inning pinch single off Red Ruffing scored teammate Cookie Lavagetto in the opening game of the 1941 World Series, before Ruffing and the New York Yankees held on for a 3-2 victory.

Riggs never quite achieved the same level in his baseball career after leaving the Dodgers in 1942 in order to serve his country in the Army Air Force during World War II.

In 10 seasons he played in 760 Games and had 2,477 At Bats, 298 Runs, 650 Hits, 110 Doubles, 43 Triples, 28 Home Runs, 271 RBI, 22 Stolen Bases, 181 Walks, .262 Batting Average, .317 On-base percentage, .375 Slugging Percentage, 930 Total Bases and 37 Sacrifice Hits.

He died of cancer in Durham, North Carolina at the age of 65. He was survived by his wife of 30 years, Nellie Dace Hornaday Riggs.

Sources

1910 births
1975 deaths
Major League Baseball third basemen
Baseball players from North Carolina
St. Louis Cardinals players
Cincinnati Reds players
National League All-Stars
Brooklyn Dodgers players
Shawnee Robins players
St. Joseph Saints players
Columbus Red Birds players
Montreal Royals players
St. Paul Saints (AA) players
Baltimore Orioles (IL) players
Newark Bears (IL) players
People from Mebane, North Carolina